Ajijas Cotonou is a football club of Benin, playing in the town of Cotonou. They play in the Beninese Second division, the Benin Second Division.

In 1981 the team has won the Benin Premier League.

Achievements
Benin Premier League: 1:1981

Performance in CAF competitions
CAF Champions League: 1 appearance
1982 African Cup of Champions Clubs – Preliminary Round

Stadium
Currently the team plays at the Stade Charles de Gaulle.

References

External links

Football clubs in Benin